Teague may refer to:

People

Given name
 Teague Moore (born 1976), American wrestler and coach
 Teague Rook, Australian actor

Surname
 Addison Teague, sound editor
 Baden Teague (born 1944), Australian politician
 Brad Teague (born 1947), American NASCAR driver
 David Teague (footballer) (born 1981), Australian rules football player and coach
 David Teague (basketball) (born 1983), American collegiate basketball player
 Dick Teague (1923–1991), industrial designer
 George Teague (born 1971), American football player
 Guy Teague (1913–1970), American actor and stuntman
 Harry Teague (born 1949), American politician
 Jason Cranford Teague, author of computing books
 Jeff Teague (music), American record producer since 1977
 Jeff Teague (automotive designer) (1956–2016), American automotive designer
 Jeff Teague (basketball) (born 1988), American basketball player
 Jennifer Teague (1987–2005), Canadian murder victim
 Lewis Teague (painter) (1917–1978), architect and painter
 Lewis Teague (film director) (born 1938), an American film director
 MaCio Teague (born 1997), American basketball player
 Marquis Teague (born 1993), American basketball player
 Marshall Teague (racing driver) (1922–1959), American race car driver
 Marshall Teague (actor) (born 1953), American actor
 Master Teague (born 2000), American football player
 Matthew Teague (born 1958), American football player
 Mike Teague (born 1960), English rugby union player
 Norman Teague, American designer, artist, educator
 Olin E. Teague (1910–1981), American politician
 Sharon Beasley-Teague (born 1952), American politician
 Trey Teague (born 1974), American football player
 Vanessa Teague, Australian cryptographer
 Walter Dorwin Teague (1883–1960), Art Deco designer
 Violet Teague (1872–1951), Australian artist

Places
 Teague, Texas, a city in Freestone County, Texas, United States
 Teague Independent School District, a public school district based in Teague, Texas
 Teague Middle School, Altamonte Springs, Florida

Characters
 Big Dan Teague, a character from the 2000 film Big Dan Teague|O Brother, Where Art Thou?
 Edward Teague, a character from the Pirates of the Caribbean film series
 Joe Teague, the main character from the television show Mob City

Other uses
 Teague (company), an American industrial design firm
 Teague or taig, an archaic given name used as a slur for an Irishman
 27412 Teague, a minor planet
 Teague v. Lane, 489 U.S. 288 (1989), a United States Supreme Court case that created the "Teague Test" in Habeas corpus cases
 Teague crater, former name of Shoemaker crater, an impact structure in Western Australia
 Teague Creek, a tributary of the James River in Webster County, Missouri, United States

See also
 Teagues (disambiguation)

English-language surnames
Cornish-language surnames